John Handcock may refer to:

John Gustavus Handcock (1720–1766), Irish MP for Ballyshannon 
John Handcock (Philipstown MP) (1755–1786), Irish politician and soldier

See also
John Hancock (disambiguation)